Events from the 1490s in England.

Incumbents
 Monarch – Henry VII
 Regent – Arthur, Prince of Wales (starting 2 October, until 17 November 1492)
 Parliament – 3rd of King Henry VII (until 27 February 1490), 4th of King Henry VII (starting 17 October 1491, until 5 March 1492), 5th of King Henry VII (starting 14 October, until 22 December 1495), 6th of King Henry VII (starting 16 January, until 13 March 1497)

Events
 1490
 Construction begins on the tower of Magdalen College, Oxford. John Colet receives his M.A. from the college.
 Perkin Warbeck claims to be the son of King Edward IV of England at the court of Burgundy.
 1491
 November – Perkin Warbeck begins a campaign to take the English throne with a landing in Ireland.
 21 December – Truce of Coldstream secures a 5-year peace with Scotland.
 Henry VII imposes a benevolence (tax).
 1492
 October – English army lays siege to Boulogne.
 3 November – Peace of Etaples signed between England and France, ending French support for the pretender Perkin Warbeck. All English-held territory in France with the exception of Calais is returned to France. France withdraws its support for Perkin Warbeck.
Richard Pynson prints his first known dated book in London, an edition of Alexander Grammaticus's Doctrinale.
 Founding date of Ermysted's Grammar School, Skipton, North Yorkshire.
 1493
 Sanctions imposed on Burgundy for supporting Warbeck.
 1494
 May – Maximilian I, Holy Roman Emperor, recognises Warbeck as rightful King of England.
 John Lydgate's translation The Fall of Princes is published posthumously.
 1495
 16 February – William Stanley, the Lord Chamberlain, executed for supporting Warbeck.
 3 July – Battle of Deal: Perkin Warbeck's troops land at Deal, Kent, in support of his claim to the English crown, backed by Margaret of York, Duchess of Burgundy. They are routed before Warbeck himself can disembark, and he retreats to Ireland and then to Scotland.
 October
 Parliament passes the Treason Act, still in force .
 Vagabond Act requires vagabonds to be punished.
 Henry VII commissions the world's first dry dock at Portsmouth.
 1496
 24 February – Henry VII signs the commercial treaty Intercursus Magnus with Venice, Florence and the villes of the Hanse and Pays-Bas.
 5 March – King Henry VII issues letters patent to Italian-born adventurer John Cabot and his sons, authorising them to discover unknown lands.
 12 June – Jesus College, Cambridge, founded.
 21–25 September – James IV of Scotland invades Northumberland in support of the pretender Perkin Warbeck.
 A public convenience is built on the "Old Welsh Bridge" in Shrewsbury.
 1497
 May
Cornish Rebellion incited by war taxes.
 John Cabot sets sail from Bristol on the ship Matthew (principally owned by Richard Amerike) looking for new lands to the west.
 17 June – Cornish rebels under Michael An Gof are soundly defeated by Henry VII at the Battle of Deptford Bridge near London.
 7 September – Second Cornish Uprising: Perkin Warbeck lands at Whitesand Bay near Land's End.
 10 September – Warbeck proclaimed as King in Bodmin.
 30 September – Treaty of Ayton establishes 7-year peace with Scotland.
 4 October – leaders of the Second Cornish Uprising surrender to the King at Taunton.
 5 October – Warbeck, having deserted his army, is captured at Beaulieu Abbey in Hampshire.
 John Alcock's Mons Perfectionis is published, the first printed sermon by an English bishop.
 Possible date – first performance of the earliest known full-length secular play wholly in English, Fulgens and Lucrece by Henry Medwall, the first English vernacular playwright known by name, perhaps at Lambeth Palace in London.
 1498
 May
 Merchant Adventurers granted a trade monopoly with the Netherlands.
 Cabot leaves Bristol on his second voyage to the Americas; he is never to be seen again.
 Summer – the final Welsh revolt of the medieval era breaks out in Meirionnydd, North Wales; Harlech Castle is captured by the rebels before the revolt is suppressed.
 1499
 19 May – 13-year-old Catherine of Aragon, the future first wife of Henry VIII, is married by proxy to his brother, 12-year-old Arthur, Prince of Wales.
 23 November – Perkin Warbeck, pretender to the English crown, is hanged at Tyburn following an alleged attempt to escape from the Tower of London.
 28 November – Edward Plantagenet, 17th Earl of Warwick, last legitimate male heir to the House of York, is beheaded for allegedly conspiring in Warbeck's escape.
 Giggleswick School is founded by Reverend James Carr.

Births
 1490
 Approximate date
Thomas Elyot, diplomat and scholar (died 1546)
 John Taverner, composer and organist (died 1545)
 1491
 28 June – King Henry VIII of England (died 1547)
 1492
 2 July – Elizabeth Tudor, daughter of King Henry VII (died 1495)
 Edward Wotton, physician and zoologist (died 1555)
 Thomas Manners, 1st Earl of Rutland (died 1543)
 1494
John Sutton, 3rd Baron Dudley (died 1554)
 William Tyndale, religious reformer (died 1536)
 1495
 21 November – John Bale, churchman (died 1563)
 Robert Barnes, reformer and martyr (died 1540)
 Thomas Wharton, 1st Baron Wharton (died 1568)
 1496
 28 March – Mary Tudor, daughter of Henry VII of England and queen of Louis XII of France (died 1533)
 Edward Foxe, English churchman (died 1538)
 Anthony St Leger, Lord Deputy of Ireland (died 1559)
 Henry Somerset, 2nd Earl of Worcester (died 1549)
 Approximate date – Richard Rich, 1st Baron Rich, Lord Chancellor (died 1567)
 1497
Anne Stanhope, noblewoman (died 1587)
 John Heywood, playwright (died 1580)

Deaths
 1490
 22 May – Edmund Grey, 1st Earl of Kent (born 1416)
 1491
 6 March – Richard Woodville, 3rd Earl Rivers (year of birth unknown)
 c. 21 May – John de la Pole, 2nd Duke of Suffolk (born 1442)
 1492
 7 June – Elizabeth Woodville, Queen of Edward IV of England (born 1437)
 20 September – Anne Beauchamp, 16th Countess of Warwick (born 1426)
 1493
 James Blount, soldier (year of birth unknown)
 1495
 31 May – Cecily Neville, mother of Edward IV of England and Richard III of England (born 1415)
 14 September –  Elizabeth Tudor, daughter of Henry VII of England (born 1492)
 21 December – Jasper Tudor, 1st Duke of Bedford (born c. 1431)
 1497
 27 June
 Thomas Flamank, Cornish lawyer (executed) (year of birth unknown)
 Michael An Gof, Cornish rebel (executed) (year of birth unknown)
 1498
 24 March – Edward Stafford, 2nd Earl of Wiltshire (born 1470)
 1499
 23 November – Perkin Warbeck, Flemish imposter, claimant to the English throne (executed) (born c. 1474)
 28 November – Edward, Earl of Warwick, last male member of the House of York (executed) (born 1475)
 Approximate date – John of Gloucester, Captain of Calais, illegitimate son of Richard III (executed?) (born c. 1468)

References